CKOS-TV was a television station in Yorkton, Saskatchewan, Canada. The station was in operation from 1958 to 2002 as a private affiliate of CBC Television.

It was a twinstick with the city's CTV affiliate CICC-TV.

History
In March 1959, in response to CKX-TV's announcement that it would extend its signal further north, Harold Olson, director of Yorkton Television said his company's plans called for extension of CKOS' signal to the Manitoba communities of Dauphin, Swan River and Baldy Mountain.

Yorkton subsequently opened CICC-TV in 1974. In 1984, Yorkton Television also purchased CKBI in Prince Albert. In 1986, Yorkton was acquired by Baton Broadcasting, which became the sole corporate owner of CTV in 1997.

In 2002, CTV sold CKBI-TV and CKOS-TV to the Canadian Broadcasting Corporation, which converted both to rebroadcasters of Regina CBC station CBKT, and surrendered both of the old call signs, with CKOS's call sign changed to CBKT-6. These translators would close on July 31, 2012, due to budget cuts affecting the CBC.

References

External links
 

KOS
KOS
Television channels and stations established in 1958
Television channels and stations disestablished in 2002
KOS
1958 establishments in Saskatchewan